A demulcent (derived from the  "caress") is a mucilaginous or oleaginous preparation that forms a soothing protective film over a mucous membrane, relieving minor pain and inflammation of the membrane. However, they generally help for less than 30 minutes. 

Demulcents are sometimes referred to as mucoprotective agents. Demulcents such as pectin, glycerin, honey, and syrup are common ingredients in cough mixtures and cough drops.

Examples
Natural demulcents include slippery elm, pectin, licorice-root and marsh-mallow.

Synthetic demulcents include methylcellulose, propylene glycol, and glycerin.

References

Further reading

External links